The United States District Court for the District of Nebraska (in case citations, D. Neb.)  is the federal district court whose jurisdiction is the state of Nebraska.  Court offices are in Omaha and Lincoln.

Appeals from the District of Nebraska are taken to the United States Court of Appeals for the Eighth Circuit (except for patent claims and claims against the U.S. government under the Tucker Act, which are appealed to the Federal Circuit).

The United States Attorney's Office for the District of Nebraska represents the United States in civil and criminal litigation in the court.  the Acting United States Attorney is Jan W. Sharp.

Notable case 

In May 2005, Judge Joseph Bataillon struck down a constitutional amendment passed by Nebraska voters in 2000 that would have banned gay marriages.  That decision, however, was reversed by the United States Court of Appeals for the Eighth Circuit.  In its opinion issued on July 14, 2006, the Eighth Circuit held: the amendment rationally related to legitimate state interests, and therefore did not violate the Equal Protection Clause; the amendment could not be considered a bill of attainder; the amendment did not violate homosexuals' First Amendment right to associate; and the amendment did not violate homosexuals' First Amendment right to petition the government for redress of grievances.

Current judges 
:

Vacancies and pending nominations

Former judges

Chief judges

Succession of seats

See also 
 Courts of Nebraska
 List of current United States district judges
 List of United States federal courthouses in Nebraska

Footnotes

Further reading
 John R. Wunder and Mark R. Scherer, Echo of Its Time: The History of the Federal District Court of Nebraska, 1867-1933. Lincoln, NE: University of Nebraska Press, 2019.

External links 
 United States District Court for the District of Nebraska Official Website
 United States Attorney for the District of Nebraska Official Website

Nebraska
Nebraska law
Omaha, Nebraska
Lincoln, Nebraska
Lincoln County, Nebraska
1867 establishments in Nebraska
Courthouses in Nebraska
Courts and tribunals established in 1867